The Corporacion Venezolana de Guayana (CVG) is a decentralized state-owned Venezuelan conglomerate, located in the Guayana Region in the southeast of the country. Its subsidiaries include the aluminium producers Alcasa, Venalum and gold mining Minerven.

External links
Official Website 

Conglomerate companies of Venezuela
Government-owned companies of Venezuela
Conglomerate companies established in 1960
Venezuelan companies established in 1960
Venezuelan brands